Wolfpen Creek is a stream in Pike County in the U.S. state of Missouri. It is a tributary of Indian Creek.

Wolfpen Creek took its name from the wolf pen, a device used to snare wolves.

See also
List of rivers of Missouri

References

Rivers of Pike County, Missouri
Rivers of Missouri